Douglas Harry Jerram (10 March 1922 – 26 May 2012) was an Australian rules footballer who played with Geelong in the Victorian Football League (VFL).

Notes

External links 

1922 births
2012 deaths
Australian rules footballers from Victoria (Australia)
Geelong Football Club players
North Geelong Football Club players